Virgin Produced is the film, television and entertainment division of the British Virgin Group. The Chief Executive Officer is Jason Felts and Chief Creative Officer is Justin Berfield.

History 

Virgin Produced was launched in 2010.  It is the film and television development, packaging and production arm of Sir Richard Branson's Virgin Group, led by Co-Founder / CEO Jason Felts and Chief Creative Officer Justin Berfield. Virgin Produced has projects in development at broadcast and cable networks.

Virgin Produced Channel 
In April 2012, Virgin Produced launched its own digital network, the Virgin Produced Channel, with programming of lifestyle, music, travel, technology and comedy content currently available on Virgin America, Virgin Australia, and in Virgin Hotels.

Virgin Produced India 

In 2013, Virgin Produced launched Virgin Produced India, which develops, packages, produces and distributes film and television content in Bollywood.

Filmography 
 Limitless –  March 18, 2011
 Machine Gun Preacher – September 23, 2011
 Immortals – November 11, 2011
 The Impossible – December 21, 2012
 Movie 43 – January 25, 2013
 21 and Over – March 1, 2013
 Jobs – August 16, 2013
 That Awkward Moment – January 31, 2014
 Bad Moms – July 29, 2016
 The Edge of Seventeen – November 18, 2016
 The Space Between Us – February 3, 2017
 Bixler High Private Eye – January 21, 2019

References

External links
 
 Virgin Group company profile

American companies established in 2010
Companies based in Los Angeles
Film production companies of the United States
P